Lee Ho (born January 6, 1986) is a South Korean football player

Club career 
On November 18, 2008, Lee was one of sixteen priority members to join Gangwon FC. He made his debut for Gangwon against Chunnam Dragons on May 27, 2009 in Gangwon's last league cup match of 2009.

On 5 January 2010, he moved to Daejeon Citizen.

Club career statistics

Honours

Team
Kyunghee University
 Korea University Football League MVP: 2008

References

External links
 

1986 births
Living people
South Korean footballers
Gangwon FC players
Daejeon Hana Citizen FC players
Ansan Mugunghwa FC players
K League 1 players
K League 2 players
Lee Ho
Expatriate footballers in Thailand
South Korean expatriate sportspeople in Thailand
Lee Ho
Association football defenders
People from Gimpo
Sportspeople from Gyeonggi Province